Sándor Szalay (also Sándorral Szalay) (6 June 1893 – 5 April 1965) was a Hungarian pair skater. With partner Olga Orgonista, he was the 1930 and 1931 European Champion. They won two medals at the World Figure Skating Championships, a bronze in 1929 and a silver in 1931. They placed 4th at the 1932 Winter Olympics. After the 1932 World Figure Skating Championships, Sándor and Olga retired.  Sándor worked as a construction inspector in a rubber factory, and served as the president of the Hungarian Skating Federation from 1945 to 1950.

Results
(pairs with Olga Orgonista)

References

 
 
 Skatabase: 1932 Olympics Results

Navigation

Hungarian male pair skaters
Olympic figure skaters of Hungary
Figure skaters at the 1932 Winter Olympics
1893 births
1965 deaths
World Figure Skating Championships medalists
European Figure Skating Championships medalists